Manara, also known as Hammara, is a municipality in the West Beqaa district of the Beqaa Governorate in eastern Lebanon. Its inhabitants are Sunni Muslims.

References

Populated places in Western Beqaa District
Sunni Muslim communities in Lebanon